(born December 8, 1975 ) is a female Japanese 
vocalist, lyricist, composer and violyre player, currently resides in Takatsu-ku, Kawasaki, Kanagawa, Japan.

Biography 
She was born in Ōizumi, Gunma, and started studying piano at the age of four, began to sing in earnest from 16 years old, and graduated from Oizumi College of Social Workers where she studied Music therapy. After she worked as a care worker for two years, she entered Yamaha Music Academy and from 2005 she started performing live as a member of a violyre ensemble unit called Konpeito.  Afterward she began solo activities, and now has been performing in various events in the Kantō region. She is also "A care worker who sings" that makes the best use of the experience of welfare for the music activity.

Discography 
 Debut Single 'Maho No Shizuku' literally 'Drops of Magic', released on December 20, 2004.
 First Album 'Dear My Friends', released on February 14, 2008.
 Second Album 'Sora' literally 'Sky' ～violyre quintet～ , released on April 1, 2010.
 3rd Album 'Byouki Ni Nattara' ～「病気になったら」in Japanese,literally 'If you fall ill', released on January 16, 2014.

References

External links 
 Hiromi Box of Hiromi Katsuka 
 Official Blog 
 Hiromi Katsura Fan site 'Marble' 

Musicians from Gunma Prefecture
1975 births
Living people
21st-century Japanese singers
21st-century Japanese women singers